Ligier Automotive is a French company which designs, manufacturers, and sells racing cars, specifically sports prototypes for various international series.  Onroak was founded in 2012 by Jacques Nicolet who split the design, manufacturing, and sales divisions of his OAK Racing team into an independent company.  Onroak has since formed an agreement with Philippe Ligier to develop new cars under the Ligier title. On 31 December 2018, it was announced that Onroak Automotive would be rebranded to Ligier Automotive as part of a rebranding and reorganization of Everspeed's automotive assets.

History
Onroak's roots can be traced to December 2009 when OAK Racing reached an agreement with Pescarolo Sport to take over their manufacturing arm, specifically the continued construction and co-development of the Pescarolo 01 Le Mans Prototype that had been designed in 2007.  OAK, while under their previous title of Saulnier Racing, had been a Pescarolo customer since 2008, campaigning two cars in the European Le Mans Series.  OAK eventually became the sole developer of the 01 design when Pescarolo went into receivership, and campaigned and sold the cars under the OAK-Pescarolo moniker.

In 2012 new regulations for Le Mans Prototypes required teams to replace existing cars with new designs or alter them to meet the regulations.  Onroak was created to develop a new design for the existing Pescarolo chassis as well as to pursue sales of the car to other teams seeking cars meeting the new regulations.  Onroak then formed a partnership with Morgan Motor Company to brand the LMP2 class variant of their new design as the Morgan LMP2, while the LMP1 version retained the OAK-Pescarolo title.

During 2013 Onroak formed a partnership with Guy Ligier to assist in the development and sales of an evolutionary version of the Ligier JS 53 Group CN prototype before designing a closed-cockpit variant known as the JS 55 in 2014.  This agreement extended to naming rights for a new LMP2 car designed and constructed entirely by Onroak in early 2014, the Ligier JS P2.  Onroak and Ligier followed the JS P2 with the JS P3 intended for the LMP3 class which will debut in 2015.

In October 2016, Onroak bought the motorsports arm of American manufacturer Crawford Composites.

Onroak was selected as one of the four LMP2 manufacturers for the 2017 regulations. The Ligier JS P217 has competed at the European Le Mans Series and IMSA SportsCar Championship, in the latter case branded as Nissan Onroak DPi.

Tork Engineering
In September 2017 Onroak Automotive acquired Tork Engineering. Tork Engineering had many years of experience building racing cars. The French company was responsible for the closed cockpit Bioracing Series sportscar. In 2007 Tork was contracted by Mitjet Series to build the Yamaha powered Mitjet 1300. In 2012 the Renault powered 2.0L version was launched. The car was available with four body types resembling BMW, Mercedes-Benz, Audi and Bugatti. In 2015 Tork Engineering also built the tube framed racecar for the relaunched French Supertouring Championship. The car is powered by a 3.5L V6 engine made by Nissan.

Models

References

External links
 

French racecar constructors
French companies established in 2012
Vehicle manufacturing companies established in 2012
Everspeed